Laurence Hayek (Larry) (15 July 1934 - 15 July 2004) was a microbiologist, and son of economist Friedrich Hayek (1899–1992).

Life
Born in Vienna, he was brought up in Britain where his father worked at the London School of Economics.  During the war the LSE was evacuated to Cambridge, and Hayek was found a place at King's College School, with the help of John Maynard Keynes (1883 – 1946), his father's friend and fellow economist.

After the war Hayek finished school at Westminster School, and studied medicine at King's College, Cambridge.

He became GP and then pathologist at Middlesex Hospital.  He married Esca Drury, a nurse, in 1961, they had three children, Ann, Catherine and Crispin.  In 1974 the family moved to Devon, where he was consultant microbiologist at Torbay Hospital. He was a council member of the Association of Clinical Pathologists and a member of the editorial board of the Journal of Clinical Pathology.

Laurence retired in 1999 yet spent much of his remaining years taking locums in other hospitals. He spent a good deal of his time promoting his father's work.  He and Esca were keen campanologists.

Hayek died unexpectedly in 2004 in Dartington, Devon on the morning of his 70th birthday with his family with him.

See also
 Friedrich Hayek

References

1934 births
2004 deaths
British microbiologists